The International Paving Cutters' Union of the United States of America and Canada was a trade union affiliated with the American Federation of Labor with members in Canada and the United States. A craft union, its members claimed "sole jurisdiction over the cutting of stone paving blocks, which includes: Flanged, beveled, and all stone blocks used in courts, alleys, yards, or streets for paving; also stone blocks and rough ashlar used for building purposes on which paving-cutters' tools are used."

History
In June 1887, delegates from local paving cutters unions across North America met in Baltimore, Maryland, in June 1887. It was founded because of recent cuts to wages in the industry. However, in that year, the Paving Cutters' joined the Granite Cutters' International Association and other affiliated unions in a disastrous general strike. Combined with the severe economic downturn associated Panic of 1893, the union disappeared. It was reorganized in 1901 in Lithonia, Georgia, and affiliated with the AFL in 1904. In 1905, John Sheret of Albion, New York, was elected secretary.

On December 29, 1937, the union withdrew from the AFL.  It survived for some time as an independent union, but by 1955 it had only 125 members, and it dissolved in about 1956.

Membership
As of 1936, the union reported 2,200 members across 58 locals (52 in the U.S. and 6 in Canada).

Canada (6): Quebec (4), New Brunswick (1), and Ontario (1)

United States (52): Maine (10), Pennsylvania (7), New Hampshire (6), Massachusetts (4), Wisconsin (3), Georgia (3), New York (3), Missouri (3), Connecticut (2), Minnesota (2), New Jersey (2), North Carolina (2), California (1), Delaware (1), Maryland (1), South Carolina (1).

References

American Federation of Labor
Paving trade unions
Trade unions established in 1887
Trade unions disestablished in 1956
Rockport, Massachusetts
1887 establishments in Maryland
1901 establishments in Georgia (U.S. state)
Defunct trade unions in Canada
Defunct trade unions in the United States